Navy eReader Device, or NeRD, is an e-reader developed by the United States Navy's General Library Program for use aboard its submarines. Released in May 2014, it gives sailors accessibility to the Navy's library and various books while on a submarine that has limited storage space for paper books; sailors are normally on a six-month deployment and have some downtime for reading. Each submarine is assigned five NeRDs. In late 2014, the Navy started released the device to its surface fleet, distributing over 1,170 NeRDs.

Each NeRD costs the Navy $3,000, but most of the cost is e-book licensing so the material costs are minimal. It has adjustable font types and sizes, includes a carrying case, is not equipped with internet capabilities due to security concerns and will be not available to the general public.

Titles included
It is loaded with nearly 300 books in a wide variety of genres as well as many Tom Clancy novels. Some of the included books:
Most of the 18 titles in the Chief of Naval Operations' Professional Reading Program
A Game of Thrones 
The Lord of the Rings
The Amazing Adventures of Kavalier & Clay
Bossypants
The Lion, the Witch and the Wardrobe
Into the Wild
1776
To Kill a Mockingbird
Bible (King James Version)
Quran
Book of Mormon

External links
 Navy General Library Program Library
 Navy General Library Program
 Navy Professional Reading Program

References

Dedicated ebook devices
Equipment of the United States Navy
Products introduced in 2014